Thomas Poon is the Executive Vice President and Provost of the Loyola Marymount University and professor of chemistry. He served as Acting President of Pitzer College in 2014 and Interim President from July 2015 to July 2016.

Pitzer College 

Poon co-authored a chemistry textbook called Introduction to Organic Chemistry, 4th Edition in 2010, which was published by John Wiley and Sons, Inc. He is a member of the American Chemical Society and the Council on Undergraduate Research. He has contributed to a number of notable research projects.

In January 2014, Pitzer College President Laura Skandera Trombley announced she had tapped Poon to serve as Acting President during a leave of absence she would be taking in the autumn. Poon assumed the role of Acting President in September 2014.

He has travelled abroad on behalf of Pitzer College. He also participated in the Pitzer College ALS Ice Bucket Challenge in September 2014 using only a small glass of ice water, in an effort to raise awareness about the disease and the California drought.

Personal life 

Thomas Poon earned his Bachelor of Science in chemistry from Fairfield University in 1990 and a PhD in organic chemistry from the University of California, Los Angeles in 1995.

In an interview, Poon stated that he is the son of an immigrant father. He has cited his father, who brought his family to the United States, as a significant personal inspiration.

He has participated in a number of triathlons and marathons, including the New York City and Boston marathons.

References

Presidents of Pitzer College
Pitzer College faculty
Pitzer College
Year of birth missing (living people)
Living people
Fairfield University alumni